Winthemia is a genus of flies in the family Tachinidae.

Species
W. abdominalis (Townsend, 1919)
W. andersoni Guimarães, 1972
W. angusta Shima, Chao & Zhang, 1992
W. antennalis Coquillett, 1902
W. aquilonalis Chao, 1998
W. aurifrons Guimarães, 1972
W. beijingensis Chao & Liang, 1998
W. bohemani (Zetterstedt, 1844)
W. borealis Reinhard, 1931
W. brevicornis Shima, Chao & Zhang, 1992
W. cecropia (Riley, 1870)
W. citheroniae Sabrosky, 1948
W. cruentata (Rondani, 1859)
W. datanae (Townsend, 1892)
W. deilephilae (Osten Sacken, 1887)
W. diversitica Chao, 1998
W. diversoides Baranov, 1932
W. duplicata Reinhard, 1931
W. emeiensis Chao & Liang, 1998
W. erythrura (Meigen, 1838)
W. floridensis Guimarães, 1972
W. imitator Reinhard, 1931
W. intermedia Reinhard, 1931
W. jacentkovskyi Mesnil, 1949
W. javana (Bigot, 1885)
W. mallochi Baranov, 1932
W. manducae Sabrosky & DeLoach, 1970
W. marginalis Shima, Chao & Zhang, 1992
W. montana Reinhard, 1931
W. neowinthemioides (Townsend, 1928)
W. occidentis Reinhard, 1931
W. okefenokeensis Smith, 1916
W. parafacialis Chao & Liang, 1998
W. parallela Chao & Liang, 1998
W. pilosa (Villeneuve, 1910)
W. polita Reinhard, 1931
W. proclinata Shima, Chao & Zhang, 1992
W. pruinosa Gil, 1931
W. quadripustulata (Fabricius, 1794)
W. reinhardi Guimarães, 1972
W. remittens (Walker, 1859)
W. rufiventris (Macquart, 1849)
W. rufonotata (Bigot, 1889)
W. rufopicta (Bigot, 1889)
W. shimai Chao, 1998
W. sinuata Reinhard, 1931
W. speciosa (Egger, 1861)
W. sumatrana (Townsend, 1927)
W. texana Reinhard, 1931
W. variegata (Meigen, 1824)
W. venusta (Meigen, 1824)
W. venustoides Mesnil, 1967
W. verticillata Shima, Chao & Zhang, 1992
W. vesiculata (Townsend, 1916)
W. zhoui Chao, 1998

References

Exoristinae
Muscomorph flies of Europe
Diptera of Asia
Diptera of North America
Tachinidae genera
Taxa named by Jean-Baptiste Robineau-Desvoidy